USS Niji (SP-33) was an armed motorboat that served in the United States Navy as a patrol vessel from 1917 to 1919.

Niji was built in 1914 by Essington Shipbuilding Company at Essington, Pennsylvania, as the private motorboat Wilfreda. She had been renamed Niji by the time the U.S. Navy acquired her from her owner, R. B. McEwan of New York City, on 21 June 1917 for World War I service. She was commissioned as USS Niji (SP-33) the same day.

Niji was assigned to the 2nd Naval District, headquartered at Newport, Rhode Island. She spent the war patrolling the waters off southern New England.

The Navy decommissioned Niji after the end of the war and returned her to her former owner on 21 January 1919.

References

NavSource Online: Section Patrol Craft Photo Archive Niji (SP 33)

Patrol vessels of the United States Navy
World War I patrol vessels of the United States
Ships built in Essington, Pennsylvania
1914 ships